Nurul Amin may refer to:

Politics
Nurul Amin (1893–1974), Pakistani politician who was Prime Minister of Pakistan for 13 days in December 1971
Nurul Amin Bhuiyan, Bangladeshi politician, member of the Bangladesh Nationalist Party
Nurul Amin Khan Pathan, Bangladeshi politician, member of the Jatiya Party
Nurul Amin Ruhul, also known as Ruhul Bhai (born 1959), Bangladeshi politician, member of the Awami League
Nurul Amin Talukdar (1946–2003), Bangladeshi politician, member of the Bangladesh Nationalist Party

Sport
Nurul Amin (sports administrator) (1919–1991), Indian sports administrator, president of the All India Football Federation from 1975 to 1980
Nurul Amin Stadium, a sports stadium in Nagaon, Assam named after the sports administrator